Christopher Juul-Jensen (born 6 July 1989) is a Danish racing cyclist, who currently rides for UCI WorldTeam .

Juul-Jensen grew up in Ireland, living in County Wicklow until the age of 16. He became the Danish national time trial champion in 2015. In August 2015  announced that they had signed Juul-Jensen on an initial two-year contract from 2016. He was named in the start list for the 2016 Tour de France.

Major results
Source: 

2007
 1st  Overall Tour du Pays de Vaud
1st  Points classification
1st Stage 3b (ITT)
2009
 7th Overall Coupe des nations Ville Saguenay
2010
 2nd Road race, National Under-23 Road Championships
 6th Overall Coupe des nations Ville Saguenay
 8th Liège–Bastogne–Liège Espoirs
 9th Overall Giro delle Regioni
2011
 1st  Overall Coupe des nations Ville Saguenay
 2nd Road race, National Under-23 Road Championships
 8th Overall Toscana-Terra di Ciclismo
 8th Overall Tour de l'Avenir
2012
 1st  Young rider classification, Paris–Corrèze
 2nd Kampioenschap van Vlaanderen
2014
 2nd Time trial, National Road Championships
 5th Overall Danmark Rundt
 6th Overall Tour de Wallonie
 10th Japan Cup
2015
 1st  Time trial, National Road Championships
 1st  Overall Danmark Rundt
 9th Overall Eneco Tour
2016
 2nd Japan Cup
 5th Overall Tour de Luxembourg
2017
 5th Road race, National Road Championships
 6th Brabantse Pijl
 7th Strade Bianche
 7th Vuelta a Murcia
2018
 1st Stage 4 Tour de Suisse
 7th Overall Danmark Rundt
 8th Overall Settimana Internazionale di Coppi e Bartali
2019
 1st Stage 1 (TTT) Tirreno–Adriatico
 1st Stage 1 (TTT) Czech Cycling Tour

Grand Tour general classification results timeline

References

External links

 

1989 births
Living people
Danish male cyclists
Sportspeople from County Wicklow
Cyclists at the 2016 Summer Olympics
Cyclists at the 2020 Summer Olympics
Olympic cyclists of Denmark
Tour de Suisse stage winners